Paramphilius firestonei is a species of loach catfish endemic to Liberia where it is found in the St. Paul, Du and Borlor Rivers.  It reaches a length of 6.1 cm.

References 

 

Amphiliidae
Endemic fauna of Liberia
Freshwater fish of West Africa
Fish described in 1942